Below is a list of all trophies and awards that have been won in all sports and competitions by AFC Ajax, since the club's inception 18 March 1900.

Football

National championship

Professional level
Ajax I
Eredivisie: 28
1956–57, 1959–60, 1965–66, 1966–67, 1967–68, 1969–70, 1971–72, 1972–73, 1976–77, 1978–79, 1979–80, 1981–82, 1982–83, 1984–85, 1989–90, 1993–94, 1994–95, 1995–96, 1997–98, 2001–02, 2003–04, 2010–11, 2011–12, 2012–13, 2013–14, 2018–19, 2020–21, 2021–22

Netherlands Football League Championship: 8
 1917–18, 1918–19, 1930–31, 1931–32, 1933–34, 1936–37, 1938–39, 1946–47,

 → Golden championship stars on the badge: 3 (1 for every 10 national titles, 36 in total)

Ajax II
Eerste Divisie: 1
 2017–18

Amateur level
Eerste Klasse: 19
 1917–18, 1918–19 (West A)
 1920–21 (West)
 1926–27, 1927–28, 1929–30, 1930–31, 1931–32, 1933–34, 1934–35, 1935–36, 1936–37, 1945–46, 1946–47 (West I)
 1938–39, 1949–50 (West II)
 1951–52, 2002–03, 2011–12 (1e Klasse A)
Tweede Klasse: 1
 1910–11

Reserves competition
Beloften Eredivisie: 8
 1993–94, 1995–96, 1997–98, 2000–01, 2001–02, 2003–04, 2004–05, 2008–09
Reserve Hoofdklasse: 4
 2004–05, 2006–07, 2011–12, 2012–13
Reserve Eerste Klasse: 2
 2011–12, 2012–13

Women's competition
Women's Eredivisie: 2
 2016–17, 2017–18

Youth levels
A-junioren Eredivisie: 16
 1992–93, 1993–94, 1994–95, 1995–96, 1996–97, 1997–98, 2001–02, 2003–04, 2004–05, 2005–06, 2010–11, 2011–12, 2013–14, 2015–16, 2016–17, 2018–19
A-junioren Eerste Divisie: 4
 2004–05, 2007–08, 2008–09, 2010–11
B-junioren Eredivisie: 5
 2002–03, 2007–08, 2009–10, 2011–12, 2016–17
B-junioren Eerste Divisie: 1
 2006–07
C-junioren Algeheel landskampioen: 3
 2011–12, 2013–14, 2016–17
C-junioren Eerste Divisie: 2
 2008–09, 2011–12
C 2 kampioen: 3
 2009–10, 2011–12, 2016–17
D-junioren Algeheel landskampioen: 2
 2011–12, 2016–17
D-junioren Eerste Divisie: 7
 2001–02, 2002–03, 2003–04, 2006–07, 2007–08, 2010–11, 2011–12
D 2 District West 1 kampioen: 5
 2004–05, 2005–06, 2009–10, 2010–11, 2013–14
D 3 kampioen: 1
 2009–10
E 1 kampioen: 3
 2004–05, 2013–14, 2016–17
E 2 kampioen: 3
 2009–10, 2010–11, 2013–14
E 3 kampioen: 1
 2009–10
F 1 kampioen: 3
 2009–10, 2010–11, 2013–14

National Cup

Professional level
KNVB Cup: 20
 1916–17, 1942–43, 1960–61, 1966–67, 1969–70, 1970–71, 1971–72, 1978–79, 1982–83, 1985–86, 1986–87, 1992–93, 1997–98, 1998–99, 2001–02, 2005–06, 2006–07, 2009–10, 2018–19, 2020–21

Amateur level
KNVB Amateur Cup: 1
 1983–84
KNVB District Cup: 5
 1983–84, 1986–87, 1992–93, 2004–05, 2007–08

Reserves competition
KNVB Reserve Cup: 3
 2002–03, 2003–04, 2011–12

Women's competition
KNVB Women's Cup: 4
 2013–14, 2016–17, 2017–18, 2018–19

Youth levels
A-junioren Cup: 3
 2009–10, 2016–17, 2018–19
B-junioren Cup: 2
 2008–09, 2012–13
C-junioren Cup: 1
 2013–14
D-junioren Cup: 1
 2012–13
F-pupillen District Cup: 1
 2009–10

Dutch Super Cup

Professional level
Johan Cruyff Shield: 9
 1993, 1994, 1995, 2002, 2005, 2006, 2007, 2013, 2019

Youth levels
A-junioren Supercup: 5
 2005, 2006, 2011, 2014, 2016
B-junioren Supercup: 2
 2009, 2012
C-junioren Supercup: 2
 2012, 2014
D-junioren Supercup: 2
 2010, 2016

International championship

Professional level
European Cup / Champions League: 4
 1971, 1972, 1973, 1995
European Cup Winners' Cup: 1
 1987
UEFA Cup: 1
 1992
Intertoto Cup: 1
 1961–62

Youth levels
NextGen Series: Runners-up
 2012

International Super cups

Professional level
UEFA Super Cup: 2
 1974, 1995
Rangers First Centenary 1872–1972: 1
 1972

World championship

Professional level
Intercontinental Cup: 2
 1972, 1995

National Tournaments

Professional level
Gouden Kruis: 5
 1906, 1909, 1910, 1911, 1924
Zilvernen Bal: Runners-up
 1916
Gouden Meerbeker: 3
 1917, 1918, 1919
Arol Beker: 5
 1933, 1934, 1941, 1949, 1951
Vriendenloterij Vriendencup: 1
 2012

Youth levels
Den Helder Maritime Tournament: 2
 1996, 2010

International Tournaments

Professional level
  Ajax Amsterdam Easter Tournament: 4
 1934, 1949, 1950, 1952
  Amsterdam 700 Tournament / Amsterdam Tournament: 10
 1978, 1980, 1985, 1987, 1991, 1992, 2001, 2002, 2003, 2004
  Blauw-Wit Amsterdam Easter Tournament: 1
 1938
  Tiel Tournament: 1
 1952
  HFC Tournament: 1
 1973
  Molenbeek Tournament: 1
1983
 Tournoi de Bruxelles du Daring Club: 1
 1935
 HCS Voetbal Cup: 1
 1990
 Bruges Matins Trophy: 2
 1994, 1997
 Trofeo Santiago Bernabéu: 1
 1992
 Trofeo Villa de Benidorm: 1
 1995
 Trofeo Concepción Arenal: 1
 1995
 Winter Algarve Cup: 1
 2003
 Eusébio Cup: 1
 2014
 Nicola Ceravalo Tournament: 1
 1992
 Tournoi Indoor de Paris-Bercy: 1
 1989
 VansDirect Trophy: 1
 2008
 Ted Bates Trophy: 1
 2009
  Tournament of Olympiakos Piraeus: 1
 1988
  SK Brann Anniversary Tournament in Bergen: 1
 1978
  Jalkapalloturnaus: 1
 1993
  Alfred Berg Cup: 1
 2003
  Total Cup: 1
 2005
 Chippie Polar Cup: 1
 2010

Youth levels
 Copa Amsterdam: 3
 2007, 2011, 2019
 Future Cup: 5
 2010, 2012, 2014, 2017, 2018
 Otten Cup: 7
 1957, 1985, 1986, 1989, 1992, 1997, 1999
 Eurovoetbal: 4
 1979, 1984, 1994, 1999
 Terborg Tournament: 3
 1994, 1999, 2009
 Marveld Tournament: 3
 1998, 2003, 2004
 Wessels Tournament: 3
 2004, 2010, 2011
 Vaarseveld Tournament: 1
 2017
 Amsterdam Youth Indoor Tournament: 1
 2015
  HKFC International Soccer Sevens Main Tournament: Shield winners
 2010

Baseball

National championship
Honkbal Hoofdklasse : 4
 1924, 1928, 1942, 1948

Club awards

Professional level

World Team of the Year: 1
 1995
European Team of the Year: 4
 1969, 1971, 1972, 1973
Dutch Sports Team of the Year: 5
 1968, 1969, 1972, 1987, 1995
Sports Team of the Year: 1
 1990
Dick van Rijn Trophy: 1
 1995
Amsterdam Sportsteam of the year: 3
 2011, 2013, 2014
ING Fair Play Award: 2
 2013, 2014
Fair Play Cup: 1
 1995
FIFA Club of the Century: 5th place
 20th Century
kicker Sportmagazin Club of the Century: 2nd place
 20th Century
Best Dutch club after 50 years of professional football: 1
 2004
VVCS Best Pitch of the Year: 1
 2012
Football shirt of the Year: Ajax away shirt by adidas
 2013–14
The Four-Four-Two Greatest Club Side Ever: Ajax (1965 – 1973)
 2013

Youth levels

Best youth development in Dutch professional football: 4
 2004, 2005, 2006 2019
Città dei Ciclopi: 1
 2010

Notes

References

External links
 History of AFC Ajax at UEFA.com
 Trophy cabinet of AFC Ajax

Honours